C. Dale Young (born April 18, 1969) is an American poet and writer, physician, editor and educator of Asian and Latino descent.

Life
Young writes and publishes poetry and short stories, practices medicine full-time, and teaches in the Warren Wilson College MFA Program for Writers. For 19 years, he edited poetry for New England Review, stepping down from the post of poetry editor there in August 2014. His poems have appeared in many magazines and journals, including The Atlantic Monthly, The New Republic, The Paris Review, POETRY, Yale Review, and elsewhere. His work has also been included in anthologies, including The Best American Poetry.

Young grew up in south Florida, and his early work is inspired by the tropical landscape of his home state. He holds degrees from Boston College (BS 1991) and the University of Florida (MFA 1993 and MD 1997). He completed his medical internship at the Riverside Regional Medical Center and his residency in radiation oncology at the University of California, San Francisco.

He lives in San Francisco, California.

Poetry

Collections

Prometeo, poems (Four Way Books, 2021)
The Halo, poems (Four Way Books, 2016)
Torn, poems (Four Way Books, 2011)
The Second Person, poems (Four Way Books, 2007)
The Day Underneath the Day, poems (Northwestern University Press, 2001)

Limited Edition

Torn, letter-press broadside (Mad River Press, 2004)

Fiction

Collections

The Affliction, novel-in-stories (Four Way Books, 2018)

Short Stories

 "The News" (The Normal School, March 31, 2016)
 "Inside the Great House" (The Hopkins Review, Fall 2014)
 "Jewels" (Waxwing, Summer 2014)
 "The Fortunate" (Blackbird, May 5, 2014)
 "Desaparecido" (Waxwing, Spring 2014)
 "Between Men" (Four Way Review, Sep 30, 2012)
 "The Affliction" (Guernica, Feb 15, 2010)

Essays

 "The Veil of Accessibility: Examining Poems by Frank O’Hara and Kenneth Koch in Light of Conrad’s Heart of Darkness"  (American Poetry Review, March/April, 2013)

Awards
2022: UNT Rilke Prize, Finalist
2019: John Gardner Fiction Book Award, Finalist
2019: Boston College Arts Council Alumni Award for Distinguished Achievement
2017: The 2016 Lambda Literary Award in Poetry, Finalist
2017: Hanes Award in Poetry, given by the Fellowship of Southern Writers
2015: UCSF 150th Anniversary Alumni Excellence Award
2014: Stanley W. Lindberg Award for Literary Editing
2012: Fellowship from the Rockefeller Foundation for residency at the Bellagio Study Center in 2013 
2012: The MacDowell Colony, Residency Fellowship
2012: 2012 Guggenheim Fellowship 
2009: Amanda Davis Returning Fellowship, Bread Loaf Writers' Conference
2008: 2009 Poetry Fellowship from the National Endowment for the Arts
2008: 2007 ForeWord Magazine Poetry Book of the Year Award, Finalist
2008: The 2007 Lambda Literary Award in Poetry, Finalist
2008: Northern California Book Award in Poetry, Finalist
2007: The Corporation of Yaddo, Residency Fellowship
2004: Academy of American Poets' James Laughlin Award, Finalist
2003: Stanley P. Young Fellowship, Bread Loaf Writers' Conference
2002: Norma Farber Poetry Award, Finalist
1992: Tennessee Williams Scholarship in Poetry, Sewanee Writers' Conference
1992: Grolier Poetry Prize

See also

Physician writer
New England Review

Notes

External links
Author's website
C. Dale Young's weblog
C. Dale Young's first published short story in Guernica
R.J. Gibson interviews the author for Lambda Literary
Sasha West interviews the author for Gulf Coast Magazine
Jacket Magazine's Review of The Day Underneath the Day
Night Air in this piece from The Washington Post (August 19, 2007), Robert Pinsky discusses C. Dale Young's poem "Night Air", found in his book, The Second Person.
Peter Campion reviews Torn in the Los Angeles Review of Books

1969 births
Living people
Young, C. Dale
Boston College alumni
University of Florida alumni
Poets from California
American gay writers
American oncologists
University of California, San Francisco alumni
National Endowment for the Arts Fellows
MacDowell Colony fellows
Warren Wilson College faculty
American male poets
21st-century American poets
21st-century American male writers
21st-century American LGBT people